Jalam Singh Patel (born 10 March 1964) is an Indian politician of the Bhartiya Janata Party. He has been Member of Madhya Pradesh Legislative Assembly from Narsinghpur constituency since 2013.

References

3.  http://myneta.info/mp2013/candidate.php?candidate_id=785

4. https://m.hindustantimes.com/bhopal/mp-wanted-on-charges-of-murder-bid-mla-attends-assembly/story-mAyTf4BbO3i2Ob4Bneow3L.html

5. http://archive.indianexpress.com/news/mp-twin--murders--former-mla-son-named-suspect/930356/

Living people
People from Madhya Pradesh
Madhya Pradesh MLAs 2003–2008
Bharatiya Janata Party politicians from Madhya Pradesh
Madhya Pradesh MLAs 2013–2018
People from Narsinghpur
1964 births